Aktinothele is a monospecific genus of oviparous velvet worm, containing the single species Aktinothele eucharis. This species has 15 pairs of legs in both sexes. The type locality of this species is Finch Hatton Gorge, Queensland, Australia.

References

Further reading 
 

Onychophorans of Australasia
Onychophoran genera
Monotypic protostome genera
Taxa named by Amanda Reid (malacologist)